Rendezvous or rendez-vous may refer to:

Arts and entertainment

Film and television 

 The Rendezvous (1923 film), a silent film adventure melodrama
 Rendezvous (1930 film), a German musical directed by Carl Boese
 Rendezvous (1935 film), a spy film set in World War I
 Rendezvous (1952 TV series)
 Rendezvous (TV series), a 1957 drama
 The Rendezvous (1972 film), a Japanese film
 C'était un rendez-vous, a 1976 French short film by Claude Lelouch
 Rendez-vous (1985 film), a French drama
 "Rendezvous" (Alias), a 2002 television episode
 "Rendezvous" (Prison Break), a 2006 television episode
 The Rendez-Vous, a 2015 Dutch film starring Loes Haverkort and Pierre Boulanger
 The Rendezvous (2016 film), an American action-adventure film
 Rendezvous (2019 film), an American short suspense-thriller

Music

Albums 

Rendezvous with Peggy Lee, 1948
 Rendezvous (Sandy Denny album), 1977
 Rendezvous (CANO album), 1979
 Rendez-Vous (Chet Baker album), 1980
 Rendezvous (George Duke Album), 1984
 Rendez-Vous (Jean Michel Jarre album), 1986
 Rendez-Vous 98 Electronic Night, a VHS recording of Jarre's 1998 "Nuit Électronique" concert
 Rendezvous, a 1992 Christopher Cross album
 Rendezvous (Michel Camilo album), 1993
 Rendezvous (Jacky Terrasson and Cassandra Wilson album), 1997
 Rendez-Vous (In-Grid album), 2003
 Rendezvous (Luna album), 2004
 Rendez-Vous (Nikos Aliagas & Friends album), 2007
 Rendezvous (M.I Abaga playlist), 2018

Songs 

 "Rendezvous", by Tina Charles on the album Heart 'n' Soul, 1977
 "Rendezvous" (Buck-Tick song), 2007
 "Rendez Vous" (Inna song), 2016
 "Rendezvous", by Scandroid, 2017
 "Rendezvous", by Years & Years on the album Palo Santo, 2018
 "Rendezvous", by Little Mix on the album Confetti, 2020
 "Rendezvous" (Craig David song)
 "Rendez-vous" (song), by Pas de Deux
 "Rendez-Vu", by Basement Jaxx
 "Rendezvous", by Bruce Springsteen on the album Tracks
 "Rendez-vous", by Culture Beat
 "Rendez-Vous", by DJ Smash
 "Rendezvous", by the Hudson Brothers
 "Rendezvous", by Tilt

Other uses in music 

 Rendezvous (band), an Israeli band
 Rendez-Vous (band), a post-punk French band
 Rendezvous Records, a 1950s record label
 Rendezvous Entertainment, an American record label founded by Dave Koz, Frank Cody and Hyman Katz

Science and technology 

 Rendezvous problem, a mathematical formulation for the optimal way to meet
 Rendezvous protocol, a type of network resource discovery protocol
 Bonjour (software), formerly Rendezvous, a computer network technology
 Rendezvous (Plan 9), a system call in the Plan 9 operating system
 Synchronous rendezvous, a concept in parallel computing
 TIBCO Rendezvous, enterprise application integration software
 Space rendezvous, a maneuver between two spacecraft

Places 

 Rendezvous, Arkansas, US
 Rendezvous Bay Pond, Anguilla

Other uses 

 Rendezvous (festival), an annual festival organized by the Indian Institute of Technology Delhi
 Rendezvous (fur trade), a large meeting once typically held annually in the American wilderness
 Rendezvous of 1832, one of the largest fur trade rendezvous held in the Rocky Mountains
 Fur Rendezvous Festival, an annual winter festival in Anchorage, Alaska
 Rendezvous (political cartoon)
 Rendez-vous '87, an ice hockey exhibition series
 Buick Rendezvous, an automobile
 The Rendezvous Society, a charitable organization
 Rendezvous Sports World, a former Indian cricket franchise
 Rocky Mountain Rendezvous, an annual fur trade gathering held at various locations, 1825–1840

See also 

 Rendez-vous in Montreal, a 1987 animated film